The Jarl Hjalmarson Foundation is a Democracy Foundation closely linked to the Moderate Party. It focuses on training of politicians active in the Moderate Party’s sister parties, especially women and youth engaged in politics, in countries where the aid is believed to be of best use. Different important issues about how a democratic political party works are discussed during the educational programmes, and how to work politically.

The foundation operates in Russia, Ukraine, Georgia, Azerbaijan, Turkey and the countries on the Balkans. Operations are also run in Belarus and in Africa and in Latin America the foundation conducts regional projects.

The foundation was founded in 1994 when the Moderate Party supported the newly independent Baltic countries. The name of the foundation is chosen in homage to the late Moderate Party Chairman Jarl Hjalmarson.

Chairman of the board of the Jarl Hjalmarson Foundation is Mr Göran Lennmarker, former MP. Among previous chairmen of the Foundation you note Mr Gunnar Hökmark, MEP and the former Swedish Minister for Foreign Affairs, Mrs Margaretha af Ugglas.

It is a member of the Centre for European Studies, the official foundation/think tank of the European People's Party.

External links 
 The Jarl Hjalmarson Foundation's official webpage

Foundations based in Sweden
Moderate Party
Organizations established in 1994
1994 establishments in Sweden